Pygmy frog may refer to:

 Beautiful pygmy frog (Microhyla pulchra), a frog in the family Microhylidae found in northeastern India, southern China, and Southeast Asia south to at least Thailand but possibly as far south as Malaysia and Singapore
 Dalat pygmy frog (Microhyla fusca), a frog in the family Microhylidae endemic to Vietnam
 Large pygmy frog (Microhyla berdmorei)), a frog in the family Microhylidae found in eastern India, Bangladesh, southernmost China (Yunnan), Mainland Southeast Asia as well as Borneo and Sumatra
 Marbled pygmy frog (Microhyla pulchra), a frog in the family Microhylidae found in northeastern India, southern China, and Southeast Asia south to at least Thailand but possibly as far south as Malaysia and Singapore
 Ornamented pygmy frog (Microhyla ornata), a frog in the family Microhylidae found in Kashmir, Nepal, peninsular India and the Andaman and Nicobar Islands, Sri Lanka, and Bangladesh
 Pygmy crawl frog (Leptolalax oshanensis), a frog in the family Megophryidae endemic to southern–central China (Guizhou, Hubei, and Sichuan provinces)
 Pygmy forest frog (Platymantis pygmaeus), a frog in the family Ceratobatrachidae endemic to the Philippines
 Pygmy wrinkled frog (Nyctibatrachus beddomii), a frog in the family Nyctibatrachidae endemic to the Western Ghats of India
 Round-snout pygmy frog (Pseudophilautus femoralis), a frog in the family Rhacophoridae endemic to Sri Lanka
 Taiwan little pygmy frog (Micryletta steinegeri), a frog in the family Microhylidae endemic to Taiwan
 Tubercled pygmy frog or Butler's pigmy frog (Microhyla butleri), a frog in the family Microhylidae found in India, Myanmar, China, Hong Kong, Taiwan, Thailand, Cambodia, Laos, Vietnam, Peninsular Malaysia, and Singapore

See also

 Pygmy tree frog (disambiguation)

Animal common name disambiguation pages